Domenick "Don" Vultaggio (born 1951/1952) is an American billionaire businessman, the co-founder of Arizona Beverage Company. As of August 2022, his net worth was estimated at US$4.4 billion.

Early life 
Vultaggio grew up in Flatbush, a working-class neighborhood of Brooklyn, New York City, New York. His father was the manager of an A&P supermarket.

Career 
In 1992, he and John Ferolito started Arizona from a warehouse in Brooklyn.

In 2015, following a lengthy and bitter legal battle, he bought out Ferolito for about $1 billion.

Personal life 
Vultaggio is married to Irene, an artist. They have two sons, and live in Port Washington, New York. Their sons, Wesley and Spencer Vultaggio both work for the company, Wesley as creative director.

In 2004, they bought a two-acre "private peninsula" in Sands Point, Long Island for $4 million, and finished building a 30-room mansion in 2007.

References

External links
 Vultaggio hosting a Reddit AMA

1950s births
Living people
Place of birth missing (living people)
American billionaires
American company founders
People from Flatbush, Brooklyn
People from Port Washington, New York